Hypersensitivity (also called hypersensitivity reaction or intolerance) is a set of undesirable reactions produced by the normal immune system, including allergies and autoimmunity. 

Hypersensitivity or hypersensitive may also refer to:
Hypersensitivity, or Sensory Processing Sensitivity, a psychological condition relating to sensitivity to processing information.
Hypersensitization, a cellular increase in the expression of a specific receptor
Dentin hypersensitivity, a cause of dental pain
Hyperesthesia, abnormal increase in sensitivity to stimuli of the sense
Electromagnetic hypersensitivity
Hypersensitive, a music album
Hypersensitive response, infection defense in plants
Hypersensitive site, a region in chromatin
Sensory overload, experiencing overstimulation 
Sensory processing disorder (SPD), a medical condition relating to abnormal multisensory integration

See also
Supersensitivity (disambiguation)